Walter Longsdon Price (2 February 1886 – 26 December 1943) was an English first-class cricketer who played three games for Worcestershire in July 1904. His best bowling return of 4/86 came in his second game, against Surrey at Worcester.

Price was born in Toxteth Park, Liverpool; he died at age 57 at Warren Cross Farm, Lechlade, Gloucestershire.

References

External links
 

1886 births
1943 deaths
People from Toxteth
English cricketers
Worcestershire cricketers